Women's associations fall under wide and diverse set of categories, yet they all have a unified goal - helping women.

It would be almost impossible to track history of the earliest women's association, but an endeavor can be made to list the most noteworthy organizations with a mission to help women in various sectors of their lives. The following is an incomplete list of notable national and International women's associations.

Business and professional
 American Business Women's Association
 Graduate Women in Science (GWIS) 
 The National Association of Women in Construction
 National Association of Professional Women (NAPW)
 National Association of Women Business Owners
 Association for Women in Science
 Society of Women Engineers
International Federation of Women Lawyers (FIDA)

Academic
 American Association of University Women

Health and medical
 Association of Women's Health, Obstetric and Neonatal Nurses
 American Medical Women's Association

 Associations
Women
Associations